Christmas in Australia is the fifth studio album and first Christmas album by Australian recording artist Adam Brand; credited to Adam Brand and Friends. The album was released in October 2005 and came with a bonus 8-track live disc.

Track listing

Charts

Release history

References

2005 Christmas albums
Adam Brand (musician) albums
Christmas albums by Australian artists
Country Christmas albums